Scott Benton (born 8 September 1974) is an English former rugby union footballer.  A scrum-half, Benton won his solitary cap on the 1998 Tour of Hell.  He played club Rugby for Gloucester, Leeds, and Sale.

References 
 http://www.espnscrum.com/england/rugby/player/12755.html

1974 births
Living people
British rugby union players
Rugby union scrum-halves
English rugby union players
England international rugby union players
Rugby union players from Bradford